USS Sultana (SP-134) was a yacht acquired under a free lease by the U.S. Navy during World War I. She was outfitted as a patrol craft and was assigned to escort duty in the North Atlantic Ocean. She served honorably—rescuing survivors adrift in the water and protecting cargo ships from submarine attack—and was returned to her owner at the close of the war.

Built in Erie Basin, New York 

Sultana (SP-134) was built in 1889 by Handren and Robins at Erie Basin, New York. It was commissioned for Trenor Luther Park and his wife Julia Hunt Catlin, of New York City. They spent their honeymoon on it and crossed the Atlantic "about 75 times" as quoted from her memoires. "We cruised from the Windward Isles to South America.  One time we cruised for a year and a half from the North Cape to the Suez, stopping wherever and for as long as we pleased." Trenor L. Park was a Harvard graduate, silk merchant and prominent yachtsman.  After his death in 1907, it was sold to Mrs. E. H. Harriman of New York City, widow of the late railroad baron E. H. Harriman.  On 4 May 1917, Mrs. Harriman loaned the steam yacht to the United States Navy under a free lease; the yacht was commissioned on 27 May 1917.

World War I service

Assigned to the North Atlantic Ocean 
 
Sultana was fitted out at the New York Navy Yard, and she joined a special patrol force at Tompkinsville, New York, on 6 June. The force sailed for France on 9 June. On 4 July, she rescued 45 survivors of the American merchantman, Orleans, which has been torpedoed the day before; and she landed them at Brest, France, that evening.

From 4 July 1917 to 5 December 1918, Sultana was attached to the United States Patrol Squadron based at Brest and performed escort and patrol duty. On 5 December, after the war had ended, she headed for home via the Azores and Bermuda, and arrived at New York City on 28 December 1918.

Post-war decommissioning and disposal 
 
Sultana was stripped of her military hardware, decommissioned, and returned to Mrs. Harriman on 17 February 1919 and struck from the Navy list.

See also 

 USS Vedette (SP-163)

References

  
 USS Sultana (SP-134), 1917-1919. Previously the Civilian yacht Sultana

Steam yachts
Patrol vessels of the United States Navy
Ships built in New York (state)
World War I patrol vessels of the United States
1889 ships